Nikos the Impaler is a 2003 z-grade splatter film directed by and starring German arteur Andreas Schnaas. It follows a reincarnated Romanian barbarian (Schnaas) as he wreaks havoc on modern day New York City. It was released in some territories as Violent Shit 4.

Synopsis 

College professor Frank Heller (Joe Zaso) and his girlfriend Sandra (Felissa Rose) lead a ragtag group of museum patrons in a race for their lives. After a botched robbery attempt spills blood on the ancient mask of Nikos a lu Unziceanu (Schnaas), the barbarian returns to kill off virtually anyone who crosses his path. After wiping out the denizens of the art museum, the maniac turns his sights on a health club, gay bar, movie theater, and video store.

Cast 

 Joe Zaso as Frank Heller
 Felissa Rose as Sandra Kane
 Andreas Schnaas as Nikos
 Brenda Abbandandolo as Daisy
 Joseph Michael Lagana as Pete
 Joe Lattanzi as Ryan

Crew 

 Andreas Schnaas:          Director
 Ted Geoghegan:            Screenwriter
 Joe Zaso:                 Producer
 C.C. Becker:                  Producer

Production information 

 The film was shot in New York City and parts of Long Island on a budget of US$40,000 and was released direct-to-DVD.
 The name Nikos was also the killer's name in Andreas Schnaas' 1999 film, Anthropophagous 2000. Schnaas played Nikos in both movies.
 Cameos in the film include Debbie Rochon, Lloyd Kaufman, Darian Caine, Tina Krause, and musician Bela B. of Die Ärzte.

References

External links 
 Nikos page at The Internet Movie Database
 

German splatter films
Camcorder films
Zombie comedy films
German supernatural horror films
Supernatural comedy films
2003 horror films
Films directed by Andreas Schnaas
2003 direct-to-video films
2003 films
Films set in the United States
2000s English-language films
2000s German films